Music Evolution is the second album of Branford Marsalis's jazz/hip-hop/rock group Buckshot LeFonque. Featuring guest appearances from David Sanborn, Guru and Laurence Fishburne, the album peaked at number 8 on the Billboard Top Contemporary Jazz Albums chart. The album is notable in Branford's discography for marking his first collaboration with pianist Joey Calderazzo and bassist Eric Revis, both of whom would go on to record in his quartet in the 2000s and 2010s.

In his AllMusic review, Leo Stanley calls the album a "stronger, more confident record" than the first Buckshot LeFonque album but criticizes it as uneven, noting that it "(finds) a vibrant, exciting common ground between hard bop and hip-hop" despite the "occasional lapse into aimless fusion." Writing in JazzTimes, Josef Woodard said the album "suggests a free-form radio show with an accent on African-American culture lineage." People magazine praised the album as "a sonic explosion that, even when it falters, is infused with the joy of playing."

Track listing

Personnel
 Branford Marsalis – Saxophones
 DJ Apollo - Wheels O' Steel
 Rocky Bryant - Percussion
 Reginald Veal - Acoustic Bass
 L. Carl Burnett - Guitar
 Joey Calderazzo - Piano
 Russell Gunn - Trumpet
 Mino Cinelu - Percussion
 David Sanborn - Alto Saxophone
 Reggie Washington - Bass
 John Touchy - Trombone
 Will Lee - Bass
 Frank McComb - Keyboards, Vocals
 Sue Pray - Viola
 Julien Barber - Viola
 Barry Finclair - Violin
 John Pintavalle - Violin
 Donna Tecco - Violin
 Richard Locker - Cello
 Carol Webb Sotomme - Concert Master
 50 Styles: The Unknown Soldier - Vocals
 Laurence Fishburne - Spoken Word
 Ben Wolfe - Acoustic Bass
 Delfeayo Marsalis - Trombone
 Eric Revis - Acoustic Bass

References

External links
 BranfordMarsalis.com 

1997 albums
Branford Marsalis albums